Stadt, Land, Mord! is a German television series.

See also
List of German television series

External links
 

2006 German television series debuts
2007 German television series endings
German crime television series
2000s German police procedural television series
Television shows set in Bavaria
German-language television shows
Sat.1 original programming